Spodnja Slivnica (in older sources also Dolenja Slivnica) is a village south of Grosuplje in central Slovenia. The area is part of the historical region of Lower Carniola. The municipality is now included in the Central Slovenia Statistical Region. 

The local church is dedicated to Saints Peter and Paul and belongs to the Parish of Grosuplje. It dates to the second quarter of the 16th century.

References

External links

Spodnja Slivnica on Geopedia

Populated places in the Municipality of Grosuplje